The archetypal Pagoda Platform Shelter was a distinctively-shaped corrugated iron structure used by passengers waiting at railway stations in Wales and southern England.

Origins
In Britain Pagoda shelters are associated with the Great Western Railway (GWR) who introduced them in 1907 and erected a patchwork of them across their network. They were manufactured by an outside supplier and delivered in kit form. They could therefore be assembled offsite, delivered on standard well wagons and craned into position, or assembled onsite, according to circumstances.

The GWR opened its first "Haltes" on 12 October 1903, anglicising the name to "Halt" in 1905. They were prime candidates for Pagoda shelters, but the market was crowded: finance, tradition, knowledge, skills and materials to hand meant that some lines had pagodas aplenty, some one or two and others none at all.

Opening halts and standardising cheap to install and cheap to buy infrastructure in the face of competition firstly from trams, then buses and ultimately cars overlapped with other initiatives such as the railmotor.

Spread

Specifications
Although they were renowned for their shape, their greatest virtues were their cost, simplicity and durability, coupled with the fact that the GWR "took them seriously". They were built to precise working drawings with materials to exact engineering specifications. The example installed at the remote , for example, had a roof made of "No. 18 SWG Galvanised 3 inch Corrugated Sheeting [...] with a floor of specially prepared timber."

Suitability
Many small halts used wooden platforms on a timber frame, rather than masonry or earth. The pagoda shelter could be used for these because of its light weight.

Platform configurations
As the halts where they were used were mostly on single-track lines, there was only one shelter, though  had only one platform with two pagoda shelters. Perivale Halt had several on each platform. Defiance Halt (later Defiance Platform) had one on each platform initially, but two more were added to the Up platform during the station's life.  had three platform faces with a pagoda shelter only on the most southerly.

Variations
Most pagoda shelters were simple structures with one doorway leading into one room. At , however, the station building was a "Pagoda Building", with three doors and four windows facing the platform and rooms inside for different purposes.  still has a pagoda shelter which used to incorporate a "lean-to" staff cabin at the Aberdyfi end. The lean-to appears to have been incorporated into the overall building since it was de-staffed. The shelter differs from most pagodas in that it is either built of or clad with timber.

Uses
Pagoda huts existed next to Weymouth Junction signalbox, and in  station goods yard, neither was for passenger use. It was still there in 1989, 28 years after the station closed and long after all other buildings had been demolished.

Other railways' pagoda shelters
In the USA Pagoda shelters were adopted on a grand scale by at least one railroad.

The present
By 2015
some survived on preserved railways
some have been erected as new builds on such lines
at least one has been rescued from a derelict site and installed on a preserved railway and
the shelter and other platform furniture at  have been preserved, but not the railway.

Most, however, have been demolished
obliterated along with the line and station, as at Mount Hawke and Goonhavern Halts.

Gallery

References

Sources

Further material

External links

Great Western Railway
Vernacular architecture